The Manchukuo Imperial Navy was the navy of the Japanese puppet state of Manchukuo.

As the southern part of the Liaodong Peninsula was ruled by Japan as the Kwantung Leased Territory, leaving Manchukuo with very little coastline, the leadership of the Japanese Kwantung Army regarded the development of a Manchukuo navy to have a very low military priority, although it was politically desirable to create at least a nominal force as a symbol of the legitimacy of the new regime.

History
When the Imperial Japanese Army invaded Manchuria in 1931, they were accompanied by a detachment from the Imperial Japanese Navy (IJN), which provided for coastal defense. However, the main naval requirement for Manchuria was the defense of its extensive border river system with the Soviet Union. Immediately after the Manchurian Incident of 1931, Kuomintang Northeastern Navy Vice-Minister Shen Honglie and Fleet Commander Xian Gongzhe deserted their posts. Local Kuomintang commander Captain Yin Zuqian met with Japanese forces and agreed to turn over his fleet of five river gunboats to the Imperial Japanese Navy in Harbin on 15 February 1932. This flotilla formed the core of the Sungari River Defense Fleet under the State of Manchuria.

The Manchukuo Imperial Navy was established on 15 April 1932, by the proclamation of the "Manchukuoan Armed Forces Act" by Emperor Pu Yi, who also assumed the role of supreme commander. However, coastal defense for Manchukuo remained largely in the hands of the IJN 3rd China (North) Fleet.

The Sungari Fleet was active on the Sungari, Amur and Ussuri rivers from 1933, and received additional gunboats from Japan. However, it proved hopelessly inadequate during the Pacification of Manchukuo, and the Japanese instituted numerous training programs in an attempt to raise its capabilities. Reserve or retired Japanese officers were assigned to the Sungari Fleet, and Manchukuo cadets were sent to study navigation and gunnery at the Imperial Japanese Navy Academy.

In November 1938, IJN units were withdrawn from Manchukuo, ostensibly because the training levels of the Imperial Manchukuo Navy had risen to acceptable levels, but in reality because of the ongoing political conflict between the Japanese army and navy over who had control over Manchuria. In November 1939 the navy came under the control of the Manchukuo Imperial Army, and was renamed River Force.

In 1942, most of the remaining Japanese personnel serving with the River Force were also withdrawn. As half of its officer class was Japanese, this left a huge gap in capabilities and the performance of the River Force deteriorated rapidly. Many ships became inoperable, and their anti-aircraft guns were demounted and used in land-based operations. At the time of the Soviet invasion of Manchuria, the River Force was completely unready for combat, and disintegrated in face of the overwhelmingly superior Soviet forces.

Manchukuo Navy Main Flotilla

Coastal Defense Forces
HQ: Yingkou Naval Base, Fengtian
 Secondary Base: Hulutao Naval Base, Fengtian
Flagship: DD Hai Wei
2nd Patrol Division (Sea)
YP Hai Lung
YP Hai Feng
YP Li Sui
YP Lin Chi
3 Patrol Division (Sea)
YP Kuan Ning
YP Kuan Ching
YP Chian Tung
4 Patrol Division (Sea)
YP Hai Kuang
YP Hai Jui
YP Hai Jung
YP Hai Hua
5 Patrol Division (Sea)
YP Daichii
YP Kaihen
YP Kaini
YP Ta Tung
YP Li Ming

Manchukuo Navy River Defense Patrol

Yingkou and Dandong Base, Fengtian
1st Patrol Division (Sungari River)
PR Ting Pien
PR Ching Hen
PR Shun Tien
PR Yan Ming
 The Sungari River Fleet operated armored cars on the frozen rivers during wintertime, when their gunboats could not be deployed.

Manchukuo Imperial Navy land units
The Manchu Imperial Navy land units were formed from Japanese and Manchu crews, together with Manchukuo security naval police. They were charged with watching ports and naval bases, and guarding dams. Organized into two units of 500 men each, they were armed with light weapons and machine guns.

See also 
 Military ranks of Manchukuo

References

External links

Global Security Wed site on DD Hai Wei

Navy
Navies by country
Military history of Japan during World War II
Imperial Japanese Navy
Military units and formations established in 1932
Military units and formations disestablished in 1945
Disbanded navies